1814 is a reggae band from New Zealand.

History
The band began in 2004 as a three-piece act formed by Patu Colbert and his sons Shaun and Jimmy. Five other members joined the band over the next five years as the original members felt they needed more musicians to produce the sound they wanted. The band's lead singer is Darren Katene.

The name 1814 was taken from the year that missionary Samuel Marsden held the first sermon in the Bay of Islands. The band have played alongside several Kiwi favourites including Ardijah, Katchafire, Cornerstone Roots, Unity Pacific, Che Fu, and Moana and the Tribe and many more

Their first album, Jah Rydem, was released in 2008. It was produced by Wiremu Karaitiana and recorded at the Muscle Music Studios in the north of New Zealand. With positive reviews. In 2011 The Covers Album was released in New Zealand by producer Hayden Taylor of Yorkstreet Recording Studios and mastered by Chris Winchcombe.

The band's second album, Relax, was released in 2012. A new feel and direction for the summer reggae sounds like "Sunshine", written by saxophonist Chris Pierce and "Unite" cowritten by female vocalist Kalani Marsters sung by Neihana Mackey Harrison. The Relax album was produced and mastered by band founder Patu Colbert and producer Hayden Taylor at Yorkstreet Recording Studios in Auckland.

Discography

Albums

References

External links

New Zealand reggae musical groups
Musical groups established in 2004